Dingqiao (丁桥镇) may refer to the following towns in China:

Dingqiao, Anhui, in Qingyang County
Dingqiao, Haining, Zhejiang
Dingqiao, Hangzhou, in Jianggan District